Acacia maitlandii, also known as Maitland's wattle, is a perennial tree native to Australia.

Description
The resinous and glabrous branchlets are generally terete in form. Flowers are yellow and occur sometime between May and October. The simple inflorescences occur singly in the axil of the phyllodes. Following flowering smooth papery seed pods form.

Taxonomy
The species was first described by Ferdinand von Mueller in 1862 as part of the work Fragmenta Phytographiae Australiae. The plant is named for an early European explorer of Australia's Northwest, Maitland Brown, who collected the type specimen. It was later reclassified as Racosperma maitlandii by Leslie Pedley in 1986 but transferred back into the genus Acacia in 2001.

Distribution
Acacia maitlandii is found in northern regions of all mainland states of Australia, except Victoria, and is not considered to be threatened with extinction. The favoured soil type is red sand, or stony ground; the habitat is sandy or stony plains, and on hills.

Uses 
The species is used to make boomerangs and spearthrowers, and the gum produced is edible. The tree is called Garrga in the languages of the Yindjibarndi and Ngarluma people.
The seeds have been identified, analysed, and monitored, as a 'wild harvested Australian indigenous food', by Food Standards Australia New Zealand. The product is found to very high in fats, over half by weight.

See also
List of Acacia species

References

External links

maitlandii
Trees of Australia
Flora of New South Wales
Flora of the Northern Territory
Flora of Queensland
Flora of South Australia
Acacias of Western Australia
Fabales of Australia
Plants described in 1862
Taxa named by Ferdinand von Mueller